Xenopoclinus is a small genus of clinids native to the coast of South Africa.

Species
Two recognized species are in this genus:
 Xenopoclinus kochi J. L. B. Smith, 1948 (Platanna klipfish)
 Xenopoclinus leprosus J. L. B. Smith, 1961 (leprous platanna-klipfish)

References

 
Clinidae